Keen Eddie is an American action, comedy-drama television series that aired on Fox from June 3 to July 24, 2003. The series was originally scheduled to premiere during the 2002–03 television season, but was postponed and premiered as a summer replacement in June 2003. Fox canceled the series, pulling it from the schedule after airing seven episodes. The remaining six episodes debuted on the American cable network Bravo and began airing in January 2004.

The series follows a brash NYPD detective who goes to London when one of his cases goes sour and remains to work with New Scotland Yard. The soundtrack and incidental music for the first episode was provided by British techno duo Orbital. Daniel Ash of Love and Rockets scored the rest of the series.

All thirteen episodes of the series were released on DVD by Paramount Home Entertainment on September 7, 2004; however, some of the music was replaced for the DVD release.

Plot
After his investigation into an oxycodone ring results in a botched drug bust, NYPD Detective Eddie Arlette is sent to London to assist Scotland Yard with its work on the same case. Eddie and his British police partner, Inspector Monty Pippin, help crack the case, and Eddie is asked to stay on at Scotland Yard. He initially declines but suddenly changes his mind to the surprise of those around him.

In addition to his work, Eddie has an adversarial but flirtatious relationship with Fiona, who occupies the flat he is renting from her parents; she begrudgingly puts up with him (and his Bull Terrier, Pete), because he has threatened to reveal to her parents that she is not actually enrolled at university. Eddie frequently tries to make Fiona question her relationship with her boyfriend, Nigel. It is possible that he would like them to break up so he might be able to date Fiona. In the final episodes of the series, Eddie and Fiona seem to be forming a deeper connection with each other, while still maintaining their teasing relationship.  In the final episode, it is predicted that Eddie will fall in love with a woman on a red bus. In the last moments of the episode, Eddie sees Fiona get off a red bus. He clearly notices this fact but chooses not to tell Fiona.

Eddie's other influential relationship, while in England, is with his friend and co-worker Monty Pippin. On his first day in London, Pippin takes Eddie to a swingers club. Pippin explains that he is not actually married but he and a friend pretend to be, so they can take part in the club. Pippin has many other strange sexual habits. In one episode, Pippin joins a support group for "sexaholics" (nymphomaniacs) but tells the group his name is Eddie Arlett. He also drops his English accent and takes on an American one. He never takes the support group seriously and promptly attempts to seduce one of his group members. While Eddie puts up with Pippin's antics, he frequently tries to encourage Pippin to change. Eddie also states that Pippin's personality is not natural as everything Pippin does contradicts something he did previously.

Eddie also has a flirtatious, albeit a seemingly imaginary, relationship with Carol Ross (Superintendent Nathanial Johnson's assistant), whom he calls "Ms. Moneypenny" and with whom he banters using double entendres. When he asks her seemingly innocent questions, she gives a sexual reply ("How are you, Miss Moneypenny?" "Completely...shaved." or "What's new, Miss Moneypenny?" "Crotchless panties." or "What's your position, Miss Moneypenny?" "On...all...fours."). Eddie frequently asks those around him if they heard her response. Except for a single incident in the episode Keeping Up Appearances, no one ever appears to have heard her sexual response but simply hear a neutral comment (when he asks her how she's doing, he hears her say "Terribly horny", but anyone he asks heard "Terribly well").

Eddie's dog Pete is extremely ill-tempered. Eddie attempts to leave him in quarantine at the airport when he arrives in England but Pippin rescues Pete, by claiming Pete is a police dog. Pete chews on everything and frequently destroys TV remote controls and cellphones. He also has strange sexual appetites, from Fiona's cat Princess to a fur coat to sleeping humans. More than once, he has aggressively cornered visitors at the apartment and forced them to stand motionless for hours until Fiona or Eddie come home.

Eddie also has a catchphrase when introduced to a villain or upon making an arrest:  "Hi, I'm Eddie...how do you like me so far?"

Cast

Main

 Mark Valley as Detective Eddie Arlette, NYPD
 Sienna Miller as Fiona Bickerton
 Julian Rhind-Tutt as Inspector Monty Pippin, New Scotland Yard
 Colin Salmon as Superintendent Nathanial Johnson, New Scotland Yard

Recurring
 Alexei Sayle as Rudy Alexander
 Rachael Buckley as Carol Ross A.K.A. "Miss Moneypenny"
 Theo Fraser Steele as Nigel
 Sophie Hunter as Lois
 Daniel Goldenberg as Johnny Red
 Alex McSweeney as One Ball Bill
 Sarah-Jane Potts as Audry
 Ivana Horvat as Milli
 Anya Lahiri as Zoe
 Meredith Ostrom as Dominique
 Sarah Vandenberg as Valentine Hughes
 Martin Hancock as Fishy
 Nick Malinowski as Cheap Trick

Episodes
Paramount opted to put the episodes in the order they were aired, not produced, for the DVD release. The most notable evidence of this is Eddie’s map of London, where he tacks a matchbook relating to his adventure, as well as Nigel's re-appearance after he's moved abroad. The number of matchbooks noticeably fluctuates when watched in broadcast order. The episode list below is ordered by their production numbers and not their air dates. The DVD release also replaces the music that was originally used when the show was originally broadcast.

References

External links

 
 Keen Eddie: An American Cop in London – PopMatters Review

2000s American comedy-drama television series
2000s American crime drama television series
2000s American police procedural television series
2003 American television series debuts
2003 American television series endings
American action television series
Television shows shot at Elstree Film Studios
Fox Broadcasting Company original programming
Television series by CBS Studios
English-language television shows
Television shows set in London
American action comedy television series